Frédéric Longuépée (born 3 November 1965) is a French gymnast and  businessman known for his activities in the sport industry, especially in the French football Ligue 1 with Paris Saint-Germain and Girondins de Bordeaux. As a gymnast, Longuépée competed in eight events at the 1988 Summer Olympics.

Biography
In 1972, at the age of 7, Frédéric Longuépée started gymnastics in the North of France.Considered as one of the most promising gymnasts, he joined the INSEP (National Institute of Sport, Expertise and Performance) in Paris.

In 1988 he competed in eight events in the French gymnastics team at the 1988 Summer Olympics.

After retiring as a gymnast, Longuépée pursued a career in sports management. In 2002 as deputy director of the French Tennis Federation, he took in charge of the general administration and commercial activities of Roland-Garros, which includes ticketing, hospitality operations and merchandising.

Appointed Deputy Managing Director of Paris Saint-Germain F.C. in 2012, after the takeover of Paris Saint-Germain by Qatar Sport Investments (QSI), he was in charge of commercial activities. During the 7 seasons he spent in this position, the club's revenues increased 8-fold, with subscribers rising from 8,000 to 32,000 and the Parc des Princes sold out virtually every game the team played.

In July 2018, he joined the Paris 2024 Summer Olympics Committee for a few months and took over the commercial and marketing management as marketing Director. The same year, he was appointed President of FC Girondins de Bordeaux.

In July 2021, Longuépée left FC Girondins de Bordeaux following its take-over by a new owner Gérard Lopez.

References

External links
 

1965 births
Living people
French male artistic gymnasts
Olympic gymnasts of France
Gymnasts at the 1988 Summer Olympics
Sportspeople from Lille
French football chairmen and investors
20th-century French people